Arthur Akre (died February 19, 1982) was an American politician. He served as a Republican member of the South Dakota House of Representatives.

Life and career 
Akre was born in Veblen, South Dakota.

In 1953, Akre was elected to the South Dakota House of Representatives, representing Marshall County, South Dakota, serving until 1954.

Akre died in February 1982.

References 

Year of birth missing
1982 deaths
People from Veblen, South Dakota
Republican Party members of the South Dakota House of Representatives
20th-century American politicians